Clarence Benton "Buddie" Newman (May 8, 1921 – October 13, 2002) was an American farmer and politician who served as Speaker of the Mississippi House of Representatives from 1976 to 1988. He was elected to one term in the state senate before beginning his 36-year career in the House, representing his native Issaquena County.

A conservative Democrat, Newman was a close ally of House Speaker Walter Sillers Jr. and Governor Ross Barnett, supporting racial segregation throughout the Civil Rights era and afterward.

Early life and education
Newman was born on May 8, 1921, at the Railroad Section Foreman's House in Valley Park, Mississippi, the fifth child of Minnie Belle (Prine) and Josephus Clarence Newman Sr., a farmer and foreman for the Yazoo and Mississippi Valley Railroad. He was named after his father and Dr. J. B. Benton, the railroad physician who delivered him.

In 1931, J. C. was elected to the Mississippi House of Representatives when incumbent R. E. Foster died in office, and he brought the young Buddie with him to Jackson as a legislative page in 1938.

Political career
A member of his local Citizens' Council, Newman was a proponent of racial segregation and white supremacy. He served as an advisor to Governor Barnett during the Ole Miss riot of 1962 and was reportedly one of the strongest voices urging defiance of federal authorities on the integration of state institutions. Speaker Sillers appointed him as chair of the powerful House ways and means committee in 1964.

Later life and death
Newman died at his home on October 13, 2002. After lying in state in the state capitol rotunda, he was buried in Cedar Hill Cemetery in Vicksburg.

References

External links
 

1921 births
2002 deaths
People from Issaquena County, Mississippi
Military personnel from Mississippi
Speakers of the Mississippi House of Representatives
Democratic Party members of the Mississippi House of Representatives
20th-century American politicians
American white supremacists
United States Army personnel of World War II
United States Army non-commissioned officers